Lady Windermere's Fan is a comedy play by Oscar Wilde.

Lady Windermere's Fan may also refer to:
 Lady Windermere's Fan (1916 film), a British silent comedy film
 Lady Windermere's Fan (1925 film), an American silent film
 Lady Windermere's Fan (1935 film), a German comedy film
 Lady Windermere's Fan (1944 film), a Mexican film
 Lady Windermere's Fan (mathematics), a telescopic identity employed to relate global and local error of a numerical algorithm